The Athi sardine (Neobola fluviatilis) is a species of cyprinid fish.

It is endemic to Kenya. Its natural habitat is in the Athi and Tena Rivers.

References

Neobola
Taxa named by Peter James Palmer Whitehead
Fish described in 1962
Freshwater fish of Kenya
Taxonomy articles created by Polbot